The collateral fissure (or sulcus) is on the tentorial surface of the hemisphere and extends from near the occipital pole to within a short distance of the temporal pole.

Behind, it lies below and lateral to the calcarine fissure, from which it is separated by the lingual gyrus; in front, it is situated between the parahippocampal gyrus and the anterior part of the fusiform gyrus.

Additional images

References 

Cerebrum
Sulci (neuroanatomy)
Articles containing video clips